The 2012–13 FC Terek Grozny season was the fifth successive season that the club played in the Russian Premier League, the highest tier of football in Russia. They finished the season in 8th place, their highest finish ever in the RPL, and reached the Quarter-Finals of the Russian Cup where they were eliminated by Rostov.

Squad

Transfers

Summer

In

Out

Loans in

Loans out

Released

Competitions

Russian Premier League

Results by round

Matches

League table

Russian Cup

Matches

Squad statistics

Appearances and goals

|-
|colspan="14"|Players away from Terek Grozny on loan:

|-
|colspan="14"|Players who appeared for Terek Grozny no longer at the club:

|}

Goal scorers

Disciplinary record

References

FC Akhmat Grozny seasons
Terek Grozny